Roberto Santiago Luco Belmar (9 January 1907 – 16 August 1974) was a Chilean footballer.

Club career
Born in Antofagasta, Luco began his career playing for the amateur team of Curicó at the beginning of the 1930s and then he played for Badminton and Colo-Colo before moving to Argentina and joining Boca Juniors in 1934. The deal was for thirty four thousand Chilean pesos, a lot of money at these time, becoming the first Chilean to play for that club and the second one to play in Argentina after Iván Mayo, who played for Vélez Sarsfield. Along with Boca Juniors, he won two local championships and then he returned Colo-Colo, winning the first professional title for the club in 1937.

International career
In 1933, he took part of the Combinado del Pacífico (Pacific Ocean Team), a squad made up for both Chilean and Peruvian players, that played friendly matches in both America and Europe

For the Chile national football team, he played in three matches in 1939. He was also part of Chile's squad for the 1939 South American Championship.

Honours
Boca Juniors
 Argentine Primera División (2): 1934, 1935
Colo-Colo
 Chilean Primera División (2): 1937, 1939

References

External links
 Roberto Luco at PartidosdeLaRoja 

1907 births
1974 deaths
People from Antofagasta
Chilean footballers
Chilean expatriate footballers
Chile international footballers
Badminton F.C. footballers
Colo-Colo footballers
Boca Juniors footballers
Chilean Primera División players
Argentine Primera División players
Chilean expatriate sportspeople in Argentina
Expatriate footballers in Argentina
Place of death missing
Association football forwards